Qullqi Chaka Punta (Aymara and Quechua qullqi silver, chaka bridge, Quechua punta peak, ridge, "silver bridge peak (or ridge)", also spelled Colquechaca Punta) is a mountain in the Bolivian Andes which reaches a height of approximately . It is located in the Potosí Department, Antonio Quijarro Province, Porco Municipality. It lies northwest of K'uyka and west of Phujuni.

References 

Mountains of Potosí Department